Vipo: Adventures of the Flying Dog is an animated television series for children, first aired in Israel. The show is also transmitted around the world and is accompanied by various kinds of merchandising.

Overview
The stories revolve around a flying dog named Vipo and is the protagonist of the show. 
Having unusually long ears, he learns to fly and joins his two friends, Henry (the stork) and Betty (the toy cat) on a trip around the world.

Main characters
 Vipo (the flying dog)
 Betty (the toy cat)
 Henry (the stork)

Secondary characters
Billy (the bull), Dr. Timmly (the guinea pig), Igor (the tiger), Nessy (the Loch Ness monster), Vincent Van Fox (the fox), Yao (the Chinese monkey), Yoshi (the mouse) Amadeus (the mouse), Amadeus' mice (the mice), Keanu (the rabbit), the Employee Rabbits (the rabbits), Jose (the donkey), Aurora (the cow), Blacky (the sheep), Alexander (the sheep), Dimitris (the goat) and others.

Episodes

Script
The scripts for twenty six episodes were written by Ido Angel, who also directed the show.

Production
The show was produced during 2004–2007 by animation and visual effects studio, Snowball VFX, in collaboration with animation studio Crew 972.
Original score music was composed & arranged by Nir Gedasi & Niv Golan.

Merchandising
The manufacturer and distributor of its diverse products is Vipo Land Inc., who distribute products such as: plush animal toys, books and booklets, 3D animated Vipo movies, audio book CDs & music CDs, DVDs, games, accessories and the Vipo baby-products line.

Broadcasting
In Japan, it aired on TBS, Tokyo MX, and WOWOW. In Hungary, it aired on Gerje TV, M2, and RTL Klub. In Turkey, it premiered on ATV, Show, and Star, along with Kidz TV. In Brazil, it premiered on Escola and ZooMoo. In Spain, Sorpresa premiered the show.

External links
 Vipo Land Inc.
Vipo Club (the official kids club)
 Snowball VFX (the production company)
 Crew 972 (the animation company)

2007 computer-animated films
Animated television series about dogs
Computer-animated television series
2007 Israeli television series debuts
2007 films
2000s Israeli television series